Events from the year 1813 in France.

Incumbents
Emperor – Napoleon I

Events
7 February - Action of 7 February 1813, stalemate between two evenly matched frigates Aréthuse and HMS Amelia
2 May - Battle of Lützen, French victory over a combined Prussian and Russian force.
20 May–21 May - Battle of Bautzen, French victory over a combined Russian/Prussian army.
3 June-11 June - Peninsular War: Siege of Tarragona, Anglo-Spanish-Portuguese forces fail to capture port from its Franco-Italian garrison.
21 June - Peninsular War: Battle of Vitoria, decisive victory by Anglo-Spanish-Portuguese forces.
7 July - Peninsular War: Siege of San Sebastian by Anglo-Portuguese forces begins.
25 July - Peninsular War: Battle of Maya, French victory over British forces.
25 July - Peninsular War: Battle of Roncesvalles, French victory over Anglo-Portuguese forces.
25 July - Peninsular War: Battle of the Pyrenees, large-scale French offensive, starts.
2 August - Peninsular War: Battle of the Pyrenees ends in a tactical Anglo-Spanish-Portuguese victory.
23 August - Battle of Großbeeren, French defeated by an allied Prussian-Swedish army.
26 August - Battle of Katzbach, French defeat by Russo-Prussian army.
26 August-27 August - Battle of Dresden results in French victory.
30 August - Battle of Kulm, French defeated by Austrian, Russian, and Prussian forces.
31 August - Peninsular War: Battle of San Marcial, Spanish victory over French army.
6 September - Battle of Dennewitz, Prussians and Russians victory over French forces.
9 September - Peninsular War: Siege of San Sebastian ends with surrender of French garrison.
16 October-19 October - Battle of Leipzig, one of the most decisive defeats suffered by Napoleon Bonaparte.
7 October - Peninsular War: Battle of the Bidassoa, tactical Anglo-Portuguese victory over French forces.
30 October-31 October - Battle of Hanau, tactical French victory over Austro-Bavarian forces.
10 November - Peninsular War: Battle of Nivelle, French defeated by British, Portuguese and Spanish forces.
11 December - By the Treaty of Valencay, Napoleon recognises his prisoner Ferdinand VII as King of Spain and releases him.
9 December-13 December - Peninsular War: Battle of the Nive, Anglo-Portuguese-Spanish army defeats French forces.
31 December (New Year's Eve) - Prussian forces under Gebhard Leberecht von Blücher cross the Rhine beginning the invasion of France.

Births
23 April - Frédéric Ozanam, lawyer, literary scholar, journalist and social reformer, founder of the Society of Saint Vincent de Paul (died 1853)
12 July - Francisque Bouillier, philosopher (died 1899)
18 July - Pierre Alphonse Laurent, mathematician (died 1854)
15 August - Léon Gastinel, composer (died 1906)
23 October - Félix Ravaisson-Mollien, philosopher and archaeologist (died 1900)
29 October - Eugène Pelletan, writer, journalist and politician (died 1884)
30 November - Charles-Valentin Alkan, composer and pianist (died 1888)
December - Pauline Duvernay, dancer (died 1894)
22 December - Jean-Jacques Bourassé, priest, archaeologist and historian (died 1872)

Deaths
2 January - Pedro de Almeida Portugal, 3rd Marquis of Alorna, general in French service (born 1754 in Portugal)
6 January - Louis Baraguey d'Hilliers, general (born 1764)
9 March - Louise Contat, actress (born 1760)
19 March - Jean Baptiste, baron Franceschi, general (born 1766)
1 May - Jean-Baptiste Bessières, Marshal of France (born 1768)
23 May - Geraud Duroc, general (born 1772)
6 June - Alexandre-Théodore Brongniart, architect (born 1739)
26 June - Jacques Thomas Sarrut, military commander (born 1765)
23 July - Léger-Félicité Sonthonax, Jacobin and abolitionist (born 1763)
29 July - Jean-Andoche Junot, general (born 1771)
11 August - André Joseph Boussart, general (born 1758)
1 September - Edmé-Martin Vandermaesen, general (born 1767)
2 September - Jean Victor Marie Moreau, general (born 1763)
16 October - Donatien-Marie-Joseph de Vimeur, vicomte de Rochambeau, soldier (born 1755)
11 November - Nicolas François Conroux, military commander (born 1770)
12 November - J. Hector St. John de Crevecoeur, writer on America (born 1735)
13 December - Antoine-Augustin Parmentier, nutritionist (born 1737)

See also

References

1810s in France